Rhinotropis subspinosa, synonym Polygala subspinosa, is a species of flowering plant in the milkwort family known by the common name spiny milkwort. It is native to the southwestern United States, where it grows in desert and plateau habitat. It is a perennial herb or small shrub growing in a clump no more than 25 centimeters tall. The stems have woody bases and green, thorn-tipped branches. The leaves are up to 3 centimeters in length and generally oval in shape. The flowers have winglike pairs of bright pink sepals and the keeled central petal is tipped with a yellowish beak, sometimes fringed at the tip.

References

External links
Jepson Manual Treatment
Photo gallery

Polygalaceae